Flexible printing may refer to:

 Sign printing, of vinyl banners 
 Flexography, a form of printing process which utilizes a flexible relief plate
 Flexible printing, of printed circuit boards in flexible electronics